A Scare at Bedtime (also known as Podge and Rodge: A Scare at Bedtime) was an Irish television show, produced by Double Z Enterprises and broadcast by RTÉ, featuring the two puppets Podge and Rodge as the hosts of a spooky tales and urban myths adult comedy show. It ran for nine series, with a total of 150 episodes from 1997 until January 2006.

Episodes

Series 1 (1997–98)

Series 2 (1998–99)

Series 3 (1999–2000)

Series 4 (2000–01)

Series 5 (2001–02)

Series 6 (2003)

Series 7 (2003–04)

Series 8 (2004–05)

Series 9 (2005–06)

External links
 

Lists of Irish television series episodes